St. Pierre (St Peter) is a village in the district of Moka in Mauritius.It is considered to be found in the heart of Mauritius.The climatic conditions is cold and ideal especially during summer with cold breeze.

The village has significantly changed over the years with a new shopping centre, namely Kendra, gyms, driving more traffic to the village. With a growing population, Saint-Pierre is gradually starting to look like a town. The bus station is situated within walking distance to the market, the Kendra shopping centre, the mosque, but a bit further from the local primary and secondary schools, which will require travellers to stop further or to get on another connecting bus. 

Saint Pierre has three banks, a market, numerous shops, a primary and a secondary school, a church, a mosque, two petrol stations, a couple of gyms a big shopping centre and much more.

Transport 
It had a railway station until this was closed down in the 1960s.

Education

Primary School:
 Saint Pierre Roman Catholic School
 Petit Verger Govt. School

Secondary Schools:
Loreto College Saint-Pierre
Nelson College

French international schools:
 Lycée des Mascareignes - Senior high/Sixth form
 École du Centre/Collège Pierre-Poivre - Primary and junior high school

See also 
 Railway stations in Mauritius

References 

Populated places in Mauritius